The Fife Junior Football League was a football league competition under the jurisdiction of the Scottish Junior Football Association, which operated as the top league in Fife until a merger in 2002; it existed for a further four years as a second-tier league before the name was discontinued in 2006.

History
The league was formed in 1913 from a merger between smaller competitions across the county, initially the Howe of Fife League (played between 1892 and 1913) and the West Fife County League (1893 to 1913), later joined by teams from the East Neuk League (1908 to 1924). It continued during World War I and had periods where there were sufficient numbers involved to have West and East sections whose winners would play off for the title. Due to anticipated problems with travelling distances, the Fife clubs chose not to join the Intermediate dispute of the late 1920s, instigated by clubs in the West of Scotland who broke away from the SJFA.

The league stopped for six seasons during World War II and lost a number of member teams in the late 1940s, but was still running in 1968 and considered sufficiently strong to form one of six 'regions' across Scotland in a re-organisation of Junior football at that time. The Fife area suffered from an economic decline in the subsequent decades, owing to the collapse of the mining industry which had provided the main source of employment in most towns and villages, with several teams folding and others struggling to continue as small isolated communities became impoverished and residents moved away.

As membership of the Fife League fell steadily, a few well-run clubs who had joined more recently than its oldest members became dominant, and in 2002 these teams were invited to form the new regional Superleague in the east of the country along with the leading teams in the East (Lothians) League and the Tayside League. Fife's setup was retained as a feeder division to the Superleague along with the other historic districts until 2006, when they were fully integrated into the East Region; Fife's section became the Central Division below the Super League and a new Premier Division, but it was disbanded in 2013, meaning the county was no longer represented separately in the Junior grade.

Later movement of Fife clubs
In 2018, a large group of East Junior clubs (including five from the Kingdom) followed the path taken by Kelty Hearts a year earlier and joined the East of Scotland Football League to take part in the Scottish football pyramid. With Glenrothes making the same switch in 2019, this left eight local clubs in the East Region, including Tayport and Kennoway Star Hearts who never played in the old Fife Junior League. A further seven clubs  left for the senior ranks in 2020, leaving Tayport as the only Junior club remaining in Fife.

Champions

1913–1968 era
Key:

Notes

1968–2002 era

Notes

List of winners

Notes

References

Fife Junior History, Eric R. Thomson
Non-League Scotland (archive version), with club progression by season 1990 to 2007)
 Scottish Junior FA Structure, Scottish Junior Football Association

1913 establishments in Scotland
2002 disestablishments in Scotland
Sports leagues established in 1913
Sports leagues disestablished in 2002
Defunct Scottish Junior Football Association leagues
Football in Fife
Scottish Junior Football Association, East Region
Defunct football leagues in Scotland